Surgical lubricants, or medical lubricants, are substances used by health care providers to provide lubrication and lessen discomfort to the patient during certain medical and surgical procedures such as vaginal or rectal examinations. Some example of surgical compatible lubricants are:

 Surgilube is a surgical lubricant made of natural water-soluble gums that also contains the antiseptic chlorhexidine gluconate. 

 K-Y Jelly was initially used as a surgical lubricant before it gained popularity as a personal lubricant. 

 Lignocaine gel containing the local anaesthetic lignocaine is a prime example of a non-irritating substances used as surgical lubricant 

 Medicinal castor oil was the original vegetable-based surgical lubricant.

 Indications for medical lubricants:Sjögren syndrome, specifically for treating vaginal dryness, dyspareunia (painful sexual intercourse) and vulvodynia (vaginal pain)

References

Medical equipment